The Rt Hon. Thomas Eustace Vesey, 7th Viscount de Vesci and 8th Baron Knapton (born 8 October 1955), is the son of the 6th Viscount de Vesci and the former Susan Anne Armstrong-Jones, sister of the 1st Earl of Snowdon. He sold Abbeyleix Castle, saddled with £1.5 million in death duties, in 1994 to the financier Sir David Davies. In addition to being a nephew of the 1st Earl of Snowdon, he is a grand-nephew of the 6th Earl of Kenmare.'

Despite the sale of Abbeyleix House and Estate, Lord de Vesci continues to promote the heritage of the town of Abbeyleix. In 2012, he gave an interview about his family's connection to the town of Abbeyleix to Glenda Gilson for Irishheritagetowns.com.

Marriage and family 
On 5 September 1987, Lord de Vesci married Sita-Maria Arabella, daughter of Brian Michael Leese, later de Breffny, of Castletown Cox, County Kilkenny, an English genealogist (of English-Jewish and Irish heritage), by his wife Maharaj Kumari Jyotsna Dutt, daughter of Maharajadhiraja Bahadur Sir Uday Chand Mahtab, last ruler of Burdwan Raj. They have three children:

 Damian John Vesey (born 1985; before his parents' marriage, so not in the line of succession)
 Hon. Cosima Frances Vesey (born 1988), gave birth to a son with hotelier André Balazs, Ivo Vesey (born 30 June 2017)
 Hon. Oliver Ivo Vesey (born 16 July 1991), heir apparent

References

1955 births
Viscounts in the Peerage of Ireland
Thomas
Living people